Bernard Pyne Grenfell FBA (16 December 1869 – 18 May 1926) was an English scientist and egyptologist.

Life
Grenfell was the son of John Granville Grenfell FGS and Alice Grenfell. He was born in Birmingham and brought up and educated at Clifton College in Bristol, where his father taught. He obtained a scholarship in 1888 and enrolled at The Queen's College, Oxford.

With his friend and colleague, Arthur Surridge Hunt, he took part in the archaeological dig of Oxyrhynchus and discovered many ancient manuscripts known as the Oxyrhynchus Papyri, including some of the oldest known copies of the New Testament and the Septuagint. Other notable finds are extensive, including previously unknown works by known classical authors. The majority of the find consists of thousands of documentary texts. Parabiblical material, such as copies of the "Logia (words) of Jesus" were also found.

In 1895, Grenfell and Hunt were the first archaeologically to explore the site of Karanis (present Kom Aushim) in Fayum.

His mother, Alice Grenfell, was living with him after his father died in 1897. She took a great interest in Egyptian Scarab shaped artifacts. She taught herself to read hieroglyphics. She published her own papers and a catalogue of the scarab collection belonging to Queen's College.

In 1908, he became Professor of Papyrology at Oxford and was part of the editing team of The Oxyrynchus Papyri and other similar works. However he was ill for four years and during that time the professorship lapsed. Grenfell was cared for by his mother and he had recovered by 1913. In 1920 he travelled to Egypt for the last time in his life and bought P.Ryl. III 457 (𝔓52), the earliest surviving witness of the Greek New Testament.

He died on 18 May 1926, and was buried in Holywell Cemetery, Oxford.

Publications 
Grenfell, Bernard Pyne and Hunt, Arthur Surridge, Sayings of Our Lord from an Early Greek Papyrus (Egypt Exploration Fund; 1897).
Grenfell, Bernard Pyne, Hunt, Arthur Surridge, and Hogarth, David George, Fayûm Towns and Their Papyri (London 1900).
Grenfell, Bernard Pyne and Hunt, Arthur Surridge, eds., Hellenica Oxyrhynchia cum Theopompi et Cratippi Fragmentis (Oxford: Clarendon Press, 1909).

See also 
 Papyrus Revenue Laws

References

External links 

Bell HI. 'Bernard Pyne Grenfell'. In JRH Weaver (ed.). Dictionary of National Biography 1922 - 1930. Oxford University Press.
The Oxyrhynchus papyri, edited with translations and notes by Bernard P. Grenfell and Arthur S. Hunt (Part 10) Cornell University Library Historical Monographs Collection, reprinted by Cornell University Library Digital Collections

1869 births
1926 deaths
People from Birmingham, West Midlands
English Egyptologists
British papyrologists
Alumni of The Queen's College, Oxford
Fellows of the British Academy
Academics of the University of Oxford
Bernard